Daniel James Simons (born 1969) is an experimental psychologist, cognitive scientist, and Professor in the Department of Psychology and the Beckman Institute for Advanced Science and Technology at the University of Illinois.

Simons is best known for his work on change blindness and inattentional blindness, two surprising examples of how people can be unaware of information right in front of their eyes. His research interests also include visual cognition, perception, memory, attention, and awareness.

Biography

Career
Simons received a B.A. in psychology from Carleton College in 1991 and a Ph.D. from Cornell University in 1997. Simons then spent 5 years at Harvard University, first as an Assistant professor and then as a John Loeb Associate Professor. In 2002, Simons became a professor at the University of Illinois where he runs the Visual Cognition Laboratory.

Research
Professor Simons' research has focused on the cognitive underpinnings of our experience of a stable and continuous visual world. One line of research focuses on change blindness. These failures to notice large changes to scenes suggest that we are aware of far less of our visual world than we think. Related studies explore what aspects of our environment automatically capture attention and what objects and events go unnoticed. Such studies reveal the surprising extent of inattentional blindness - the failure to notice unusual and salient events in their visual world when attention is otherwise engaged and the events are unexpected. Other active research interests include scene perception, object recognition, visual memory, visual fading, attention, and driving and distraction. Research in his laboratory adopts methods ranging from real-world and video-based approaches to computer-based psychophysical techniques, and it includes basic behavioral measures, eye tracking, simulator studies, and training studies. This diversity of approaches helps establish closer links between basic research on the mechanisms of attention and the real-world implications and consequences of the findings.

Awards
In 2003, Simons won the APA Distinguished Scientific Award for Early Career Contributions to Psychology.  He was also an Alfred P. Sloan Research Fellow from 1999 to 2003.  In 2004, Simons and his collaborator, Christopher Chabris, won the Ig Nobel Prize for demonstrating that even gorillas can become invisible when people are attending to something else.  Throughout his career, Simons has also been awarded numerous teaching and mentoring awards for his dedication to quality undergraduate and graduate education.

References

Books
 The Invisible Gorilla (2010)
 Change Blindness and Visual Memory (2000)

Articles and essays
  Daniel J Simons' Reprint Archive
 Scholarpedia entry on inattentional blindness written by Simons

External links
 Daniel Simons's website
 The SimonsLab website
 University of Illinois Listing
 The Invisible Gorilla blog
 Daniel Simons's blog

Demos
 Basketball Video
 Monkey Business Illusion
 Visual Cognition Lab Demos

1969 births
Living people
21st-century American psychologists
University of Illinois Urbana-Champaign faculty
Cornell University alumni
Carleton College alumni
20th-century American psychologists